Brother's Keeper is a 2014 Nigerian thriller drama film directed by Ikechukwu Onyeka, and starring Majid Michel, Omoni Oboli, Beverly Naya and Barbara Soky.

Cast
Majid Michel as Chude Nwankwo
Majid Michel as Chidi Nwankwo
Omoni Oboli as Mena
Beverly Naya as Cassandra Okoro
Barbara Soky as Mrs Nwankwo
Moyo Lawal as Ada 
Tobe Oboli as Daniel
Tobe Oboli as David
Ikechukwu Onyeka as DPO
Chigozie Atuanya as Assassin

See also
 List of Nigerian films of 2014

References

2014 films
2014 thriller drama films
English-language Nigerian films
2014 drama films
Nigerian thriller drama films
2010s English-language films